Alex G. Spanos Center is a 6,150-seat, indoor multi-purpose stadium on the campus of the University of the Pacific in Stockton, California.

The Alex G. Spanos Center opened on September 9, 1981, and was constructed for over $7 million.  It is named after late Pacific alumnus and Los Angeles Chargers owner Alex Spanos. The arena consists of 3,000 chair-back seats with the rest of the capacity coming from bleacher style seating.  If needed, the arena can expand its capacity to 8,000 for certain events. This arena was the premiere sports and entertainment venue in the Stockton area until the completion of Stockton Arena in 2005.

Tenants
Alex G. Spanos Center is currently the home for several University of the Pacific's sports programs, including the Pacific Tigers men's basketball, Pacific Tigers women's basketball and Pacific Tigers women's volleyball.

On October 15, 2008, Pacific hosted a pre-season NBA exhibition between the Los Angeles Clippers and the Sacramento Kings.

See also
 List of NCAA Division I basketball arenas

References

External links
Alex G. Spanos Center

Basketball venues in California
College basketball venues in the United States
College volleyball venues in the United States
Volleyball venues in California
Pacific Tigers basketball